The following is a timeline of the history of the city of Asmara, Eritrea. Asmara was under Italian colonial rule from 1889 until 1941.

Prior to 20th century

 circa 1515 CE - Four villages merge to become "Asmera" (traditional date).
 16th century - Asmara sacked by Muslim forces.
 1889 - 3 August: Asmara occupied by Italian forces under command of Baldissera.
 1895 - Governor's Palace built.
 1900 - Capital of colonial Italian Eritrea moved to Asmara from Massawa.

20th century
 1905 - Congresso Coloniale Italiano held in Asmara.
 1906 - Asmara Synagogue built.
 1911 - Ferrovia Massaua-Asmara begins operating;  opens.
 1920
 Teatro Asmara (theatre) opens.
 Population: 14,711.
 1922 - Airport begins operating.
 1923 - Church of Our Lady of the Rosary built.
 1930s - New Governor's Palace built (now City Hall).
 1935 - Population: 16,000 (12,000 Africans + 4,000 Italians).
 1936 - Apartheid begins; city racially divided into nazionali (white) and indigeni (black) areas.
 1937
 Asmara-Massawa Cableway begins operating.
 Albergo CIAAO (hotel) built for the Compagnia Immobiliare Alberghi Africa Orientale.
 Cinema Excelsior and Cinema Teatro Augustus open.
 1938
 Great Mosque of Asmara, Cicero Stadium, and Fiat Tagliero Building constructed.
 Cinema Impero opens.
 1939
 Asmara Brewery in business.
 Population: 84,000 (36,000 Africans + 48,000 Italians).
 1941
 March. British occupy city.
 Asmara Brewery FC (football club) formed.
 1945 - Red Sea FC (football club) formed.
 1951 - British occupation ends.
 1952 - City becomes part of Ethiopia per United Nations decision.
 1953 - United States military signals intelligence Kagnew Station in operation.
 1957 -  (school) active.
 1958
 Catholic College of the Santa Famiglia founded.
 Denden Stadium opens.
 1959 - Catholic Apostolic Vicariate of Asmara active.
 1962 - Population: 120,000.
 1964 - Population: 131,800.
 1968
 January: Part of 1968 African Cup of Nations football contest held in Asmara.
 University of Asmara active.
 1969 - Kidane Mehret Cathedral built.
 1974
 Coordinating Committee of the Armed Forces, Police, and Territorial Army (Derg) in power.
 28 December: Massacre occurs during the Eritrean War of Independence.
 1975
 February: Fighting, Massacre occurs.
 July: Fighting occurs.
 1985 - Population: 284,748 (estimate).
 1990
 Siege of city begins.
 Population: 358,100 (estimate).
 1991
 24 May: Eritrean People's Liberation Front take city; Derg rule ends.
  newspaper begins publication.
 1993
 24 May: Asmara becomes capital of independent Eritrea.
 Eri-TV begins broadcasting.
 1998 - 5 June: Airport bombed by Ethiopian forces during the Eritrean–Ethiopian War.

21st century
 2002 - Semere Russom becomes mayor of Asmara and administrator of the Central Region.
 2013 - 21 January: 2013 Eritrean Army mutiny occurs at Eri-TV building.
 2017 - Italian city centre designated an UNESCO World Heritage Site.
 2018 - Population: 501,203 (estimate).
 2020 - Rocket attacks.

See also
 Asmara history
 Asmara under Italy, 1889-1941

References

This article incorporates information from the Italian Wikipedia and Spanish Wikipedia.

Bibliography

 
 
  
 
  
 
  
 
  ISSN 2038-0925.

External links

   (Bibliography of open access  articles)
  (Bibliography)
 
  (Bibliography)
  (Images, etc.)
  (Images, etc.)

Asmara
 
Years in Eritrea
Eritrea history-related lists
Asmara